Triathlon, for the 2019 Island Games, was held at Eastern Beach, Gibraltar on 7 July 2019.

Medal Table

Results

Men

Women

References 

2019 Island Games
2019
Island Games